The Kantonsspital St. Gallen (German for: Canton of St. Gallen-Hospital) is the main hospital of the Canton of St. Gallen and the sixth largest of Switzerland. It lies in the center of St. Gallen, the capital of the canton.

References

Carl Wegelin: Die Geschichte des Kantonsspitals St. Gallen. Fehr, St. Gallen 1953
Hubert Patscheider: Das Kantonsspital St. Gallen 1953–1988. Staatsarchiv und Stiftsarchiv (SGKG 20), St. Gallen 1991, 
Rita M. Fritschi: „Der arme Lazarus im Kulturstaat“. Die Entstehung und die ersten Betriebsjahre des Kantonsspitals St. Gallen 1845–1880. Staatsarchiv und Stiftsarchiv (SGKG 29), St. Gallen 1997, 

Buildings and structures in St. Gallen (city)
Hospitals in Switzerland